Jacques de Coras (1625 – 24 December 1677) was a French poet born in Toulouse. Grandson of the Huguenot jurist Jean de Coras, he was raised in the Protestant Reformed Church of France. After serving as a cadet in the military, he studied theology, and exercised the functions of a Protestant minister in Guyenne. He was, during the same time, associated with the person of Turenne, and he converted to Catholicism. He mixed to good effect his poetic studies and his religious work. He died in 1677.

Works 
la Conversion de Jacques de Coras, dédiée à nosseigneurs du clergé de France; 1665, Paris, in-12.
Jonas, ou Ninive pénitente; 1663, Paris, in-12.
Three poems, Josué, Samson, and David, were published under the title Œvres poétiques; 1665, Paris, 1n-12.

Sources

This article, in its inaugural (Nov 2005) edition, consists largely of material translated from the article, Coras (Jacques de), in the French-language Nouvelle Biographie Général: 1860, Paris: Fermin Didot Frères. vol.xi, column 764. That article, itself, gives as a reference, Moréri, Grand dict. hist.

Writers from Toulouse
1625 births
1677 deaths
Converts to Roman Catholicism from Calvinism
17th-century French poets
17th-century French male writers
17th-century French dramatists and playwrights